In the Chicago mayoral election of 1889, Democrat DeWitt Clinton Cregier defeated incumbent Republican John A. Roche, winning a majority of the vote and a margin of victory in excess of ten percent.

The election was held on April 2, 1889.

Campaign
Cregier backed strongly by trade unions. John Peter Altgeld threw his backing behind Cregier's candidacy.

Results

Creiger received 76.86% of the Polish-American vote, while  Roche received 23.07%.

References

Mayoral elections in Chicago
Chicago
Chicago
1880s in Chicago